The Office of Financial Research (OFR) is an independent bureau reporting to the United States Department of the Treasury. It was established by the Dodd–Frank Wall Street Reform and Consumer Protection Act, whose passage in 2010 was a legislative response to the financial crisis of 2007–08 and the subsequent Great Recession. The OFR is tasked with (1) collecting and standardizing data, (2) performing applied research and essential long-term research; and (3) developing risk measurement and monitoring tools.  The OFR is also responsible for providing support to the Financial Stability Oversight Council (FSOC).

Director 
The director of the Office of Financial Research is appointed for a six-year term. Under the Trump presidency, the agency became less independent when the director was made subordinate to the secretary of the Treasury.  The director, in consultation with the chairman of the FSOC (who is the secretary of the Treasury) proposes the OFR annual budget. The director may set salaries of the office's employees “without regard to chapter 51 or subchapter III of chapter 53 of Title 5 of the United States Code, relating to classification of positions and General Schedule pay rates”.

Authority 
The director has subpoena power and may require from any financial institution (bank or non-bank) any data needed to carry out the functions of the office.  However, this power has not been used or tested.

Responsibilities

The Dodd-Frank Act charged the Office of Financial Research with supporting the Financial Stability Oversight Council and member agencies by:  

 Collecting data on behalf of the council, and providing such data to the council and member agencies;
 Standardizing the types and formats of data reported and collected; 
 Performing applied research and essential long-term research; 
 Developing tools for risk measurement and monitoring;
 Performing other related services;
 Making the results of its activities available to financial regulatory agencies; and
 Assisting FSOC member agencies in determining the types and formats of data authorized by the act to be collected by the member agencies.

Resources 
Like the FSOC, the Office of Financial Research may request, from any US department or agency "such services, funds, facilities, staff, and other support services as the Office may determine advisable. Any Federal Government employee may be detailed to the Office without reimbursement, and such detail shall be without interruption or loss of civil service status or privilege." Within the Treasury, there is a revolving fund, the Financial Research Fund into which all appropriations, fees, and assessments that the Office receives are deposited. Surplus funds may be invested. It was envisioned that within two years of its establishment the office would be self-funding.

By fiscal 2016, the bureau had 225 employees and a budget of $99 million from fees paid by banks. In 2018, the OFR went through a substantial reduction in its workforce. President Trump claimed he was saving tax payers' money even though the funding came from fees. At the end of 2018, the OFR had slightly over 100 employees.

Financial Instrument Reference Database (FIRD) 
In 2020, the OFR announced a Financial Instrument Reference Database (FIRD). The aim is for users to compare definitions from different industry standards to help identify inconsistencies in financial terms. Five common asset classes are covered: equities, debt, options, warrants, and futures. By 2023, the FIRD used data sources from three international bodies for these five types of assets:

 ISO 20022, the foundational source in December 2020. This included definitions of the terms and conditions of contracts, as well as the instruments themselves.
 the ACTUS Financial Research Foundation’s data dictionary (added in October 2021). There is an ACTUS Data Standard that defines a universal set of legal terms (CT attributes) that are used as parameters in financial agreements, and an Algorithmic Standard that defines the logic embedded in legal agreements that turn contract terms into actual cash flows, or business events. These are regarded as important in the tokenization of financial instruments and the development of smart contracts for decentralized finance (DeFi).
 the Financial Information eXchange (FIX) messaging standard used in financial markets for the electronic communication of indications, orders, and executions (added in November 2022).

The OFR was also working with the X9 Financial Industry Forum on Financial Terms Harmonization to collect comments on the definitions available in the FIRD.

Workforce development 
The Office has broad latitude in performing support services for both the Council and other Member Agencies, including data collection, applied research and essential long-term research, and developing tools for monitoring risk. The Office can also issue guidelines to standardizing the way data is reported, constituent agencies have three years to implement data standardization guidelines. In many ways, the Office of Financial Research is to be operated without the constraints of the Civil Service system. For example, it does not need to follow federal pay scale guidelines (see above), and it is mandated that the office have:
 Training and Workforce Development Plan that includes training, leadership development and succession planning
 Workplace Flexibility Plan that includes telework, flexible work schedules, job sharing, parental leave benefits and childcare assistance, domestic partner benefits
 Recruitment and Retention Plan

Temporary management reporting 
For a period of five years after enactment, the Office shall submit an annual report to the Senate Committee on Banking, Housing and Urban Affairs, and the House Committee on Financial Services, what amounts to a management report, including:
 Training And Workforce Development Plan – that includes:
 Identification of skill and technical expertise needs and action taken to meet the requirements
 Steps taken to foster innovation and creativity
 Leadership development and succession Planning
 Effective use of technology by employees
 Workplace Flexibility Plan – that includes:
 Telework 
 Flexible work schedules
 Phased retirement
 Reemployment annuitants
 Parental leave benefits and childcare assistance
 Domestic partner benefits
 Other workplace flexibilities
 Recruitment and Retention Plan – that includes:
 The steps necessary to target highly qualified applicant pools with diverse backgrounds
 Streamlined employment application process
 Timely notification of employment applications
 Measures of hiring effectiveness

Sections

Data and Research & Analysis Centers 

The Office is supported by two entities:
 The Data Center, which collects, validates and maintains (and publishes some of) the data required to support the council; which may be obtained from commercial data providers, publicly available data sources and the financial entities supervised by state and federal agencies; and
 The Research and Analysis Center, which conducts independent analysis of available information to identify financially destabilizing effects, and develops and maintains independent analytical capabilities and computing resources to:
 Develop and maintain metrics and reporting systems for risks to the financial stability of the United States
 Monitor, investigate, and report on changes in systemwide risk levels and patterns to the Council and Congress
 Conduct, coordinate, and sponsor research to support and improve regulation of financial entities and markets
 Evaluate and report on stress tests or other stability-related evaluations of financial entities overseen by the member agencies
 Maintain expertise in such areas as may be necessary to support specific requests for advice and assistance from financial regulators
 Investigate disruptions and failures in the financial markets, report findings, and make recommendations to the Council based on those findings;
 Conduct studies and provide advice on the impact of policies related to systemic risk; and
 Promote best practices for financial risk management.

Reporting 
The Director reports to and testifies before only the Senate Committee on Banking, Housing, and Urban Affairs and the House Committee on Financial Services of the House of Representatives. Testimony shall be annual on the activities of the Office, including the work of the Data Center and the Research and Analysis Center and the assessment of significant financial and market developments and potential emerging threats to the financial stability of the Country. These reports to Congress are independent of any political influence in that "No officer or agency of the United States shall have any authority to require the Director to submit the testimony ... for approval, comment, or review prior to the submission of such testimony."

List of directors of the Office of Financial Research

See also

Financial crisis of 2007–08
Regulatory responses to the subprime crisis
Subprime mortgage crisis solutions debate
Wall Street reform
Title 12 of the Code of Federal Regulations
Macroprudential regulation
Systemic Risk Council
Volcker Rule

References

External links

Office of Financial Research 2014 Annual Report
Office of Financial Research Strategic Plan Fiscal Years 2015-2019

Financial regulation